Acrognathus (from  , 'high' and   'jaw') is an extinct genus of prehistoric bony fish belonging to the order Aulopiformes.

See also

 Prehistoric fish
 List of prehistoric bony fish

References

Prehistoric bony fish genera
Taxa named by Louis Agassiz